Violet Mersereau (October 2, 1892 – November 12, 1975) was an American stage and film actress. Over the course of her screen career, Mersereau appeared in over 100 short and silent film features.

Early life
Mersereau was born in New York City and had a younger sister, Claire (18941982). Mersereau's father died when she was 9 years old. Mersereau's maternal grandmother, Mme. Luzanzie, had been a noted stage actress in France. While Mersereau's own mother had acting aspirations, she never pursued a career in acting but decided to allow her children to begin acting.

Career 
At the age of 8, Mersereau played child parts in repertory theatre. She toured with Margaret Anglin and portrayed the role of "Flora" in the original company of The Clansman. The play continued to show for three years. During her time as a stage actress, Mersereau was given the nickname "The Child Wonder". She also starred on the touring production of Rebecca of Sunnybrook Farm and then became a screen actress.

In 1908, Mersereau made her first film for the Biograph Company. She stayed with the company until 1911. Mersereau then signed with Independent Moving Pictures where she appeared in ingenue roles. She found success with these roles and was often cast as innocent young helpless girls which was a popular staple in films at the time. When Independent Moving Pictures and several other studios merged to form Universal Pictures, Mersereau continued working for Universal. During this time, Mersereau appeared in several short films alongside William Garwood (who often directed the films).

In 1916, Carl Laemmle decided to open one of his eastern United States studios for Mersereau's own productions. Laemmle engaged Oscar A. C. Lund to direct her in these features. Mersereau had always exhibited a distinct preference for working in the East, and disliked California. Among her most successful ventures for Blue Bird and Universal include The Boy Girl (1917), Morgan's Raiders (1918), Little Miss Nobody (1917), Susan's Gentleman (1917), The Honor of Mary Blake (1916), Souls United (1917), Autumn (1916), and The Little Terror (1917).

The most acclaimed project of  Mersereau's final period was Nero (1922), directed by J. Gordon Edwards, grandfather of Blake Edwards.  she continued in motion pictures into the 1920s with her final film being The Wives of the Prophet (1926), in which she had the role of Alma.

Personal life 
Mersereau died on November 12, 1975 in Plymouth, Massachusetts, at the age of 83.

Selected filmography 

 The Feud and the Turkey (1908)
 The Test of Friendship (1908)
 The Cricket on the Hearth (1909)
 The Lonely Villa (1909)
 His Lost Love (1909)
 His Trust (1911)
 His Trust Fulfilled (1911)
 The Spitfire (1914)
 On Dangerous Ground (1915)
 The Stake (1915)
 The Supreme Impulse (1915)
 Wild Blood (1915)
 The Adventure of the Yellow Curl Papers (1915)
 Uncle's New Blazer (1915)
 Destiny's Trump Card (1915)
 You Can't Always Tell (1915)
 Larry O'Neill (1915)
 Thou Shalt Not Lie (1915)
 Driven by Fate (1915)
 Billy's Love Making (1915)
 The Wolf of Debt (1915)
 The Unnecessary Sex (1915)
 Getting His Goat (1915)
 The Great Problem (1916)
 The Doll Doctor (1916)
 His Picture (1916)
 Broken Fetters (1916)
 The Gentle Art of Burglary (1916)
 Susan's Gentleman (1917)
 The Raggedy Queen (1917)
 The Little Terror (1917)
 The Girl by the Roadside (1917)
 The Boy Girl (1917)
 Little Miss Nobody (1917)
 The Midnight Flyer (1918)
 Proxy Husband (1919)
 Finders Keepers (1921)
 Out of the Depths (1921)
 Nero (1922)
 The Shepherd King (1923)
 Her Own Free Will (1924)
 Lend Me Your Husband (1924)
 The Wives of the Prophet (1926)

References

Additional sources 
 Iowa City, Iowa Citizen, Violet Mersereau, Tuesday, October 1, 1918. Page 5.
 Lincoln, Nebraska Sunday Star, Answers To Movie Fans, March 18, 1917, Page 3.
 Lincoln Sunday Star, Answers To Movie Fans, March 25, 1923, Page 15.
 Biography and Filmography of Violet Mersereau at KinoTV.com

External links

 
 
Portrait of Violet Mersereau
 

1892 births
1975 deaths
20th-century American actresses
Actresses from New York City
American child actresses
American film actresses
American people of French descent
American silent film actresses
American stage actresses
People from Plymouth, Massachusetts